Leptolalax melicus (Appleby's Asian toad;) is a frog species in the family Megophryidae. It is endemic to Cambodia where it is only known from near its type locality, Virachey National Park, Ratanakiri Province; it is expected to have a wider distribution that may reach Laos and Vietnam. Leptolalax melicus have only been found near rocky streams in evergreen forest between  altitude.

Description
Leptolalax melicus is a small species even among the generally small Leptolalax: seven adult males were recorded to measure  in snout-vent length. It is morphologically similar to Leptolalax applebyi. The advertisement call of male Leptolalax melicus is unique, consisting of a single long introductory note containing 8–50 pulses, followed by 3–11 predominantly single-pulsed notes.

References

melicus
Endemic fauna of Cambodia
Amphibians of Cambodia
Frogs of Asia
Amphibians described in 2010